Events in the year 2014 in the Islamic Republic of Iran.

Incumbents
 Supreme Leader – Ali Khamenei
 President – Hassan Rouhani
 Vice President – Eshaq Jahangiri 
 Speaker of Parliament – Ali Larijani
 Chief Justice – Sadeq Larijani

Events

January
 January 18 – An Iranian diplomat is killed in Yemen's capital Sana'a when he resisted gunmen who were trying to kidnap him near the ambassador's residence.
 January 20 
The United States rejects the invitation of Iran by the United Nations in peace talks involving Syria.
Certain sanctions against Iran are lifted by the European Union and the United States through a nuclear deal.
Implementation of the six-month Geneva interim agreement on the Iranian nuclear program begins.
 January 30 – Mohammad-Ali Najafi resigns as Head of Iran's Cultural Heritage, Handcrafts and Tourism Organization, marking the first change in President Rouhani's cabinet.

February
 February 9 – Iranian officials say that two Iranian Navy warships will be travelling very close to the United States' maritime border in the Atlantic Ocean.
 February 9 – Iran agrees to a United Nations plan to address suspicions that they are working on designing an atomic weapon.
 February 17 – Iran's ambassador to Russia says that Russia could build a second reactor at Iran's Bushehr nuclear power plant in exchange for Iranian oil, under an oil-for-goods deal being negotiated that has alarmed the United States.

March
 March 5 – The Israel Defense Forces captures an Iranian ship carrying long-range artillery rockets to Palestinians in the Gaza Strip.

May
 May 21 – Six Iranians that were arrested have been released in Tehran after releasing a fan video set to Pharrell Williams' "Happy", sparking outcries over the internet.
 May 22 – Negotiations between Iran and Russia regarding the building of two additional nuclear reactors at Iran's Bushehr power plant take place.
 May 24 – Mahafarid Amir Khosravi is executed for masterminding the largest fraud case in Iran since the 1979 Revolution.

June
 June 2 – A massive dust storm strikes Tehran.
 June 30 – British-Iranian women's rights activist Ghoncheh Ghavami is arrested after being briefly detained on June 20 for attempting to attend a volleyball match between Iran and Italy. Women are forbidden to attend large sporting events in Iran. Her detention in Evin Prison continues.

July
 July 22 – The Washington Post reporter Jason Rezaian and his wife Yeganeh Salehi, a correspondent for The National, are arrested by Iranian authorities. The authorities have not disclosed their whereabouts or welfare, or the reason for their detention.

August
 August 10 – Sepahan Airlines Flight 5915 crashes in Tehran.
 August 18 – The 6.2  Murmuri earthquake shook western Iran with a maximum Mercalli intensity of VIII (Severe), injuring 60–330 people.
 August 30 – An Iranian man, Soheil Arabi, is sentenced to death for "insulting the Prophet"
 An Iranian doctor named Nasser Fahimi was sentenced to 10 years in prison by the Iranian judiciary on charges of acting against the country.

September
 September 1 – Mohammad Reza Rahimi, former Iranian vice president, is convicted to a prison term for his role in the 2011 embezzlement scandal.
 September 5 – Iranian air traffic control requires a plane chartered by US-led coalition forces in Afghanistan to land over issues with the flight plan. The flight later resumes without further incident.

Notable deaths
 January 27 – Hashem Shabani, executed prisoner
 June 1 – Gholamreza Khosravi Savadjani, executed prisoner
 August 19 – Simin Behbahani, prominent poet
 October 15 - Abd al-Hussein al-Salihi, Iranian-Iraqi historian and religious writer.  
 October 21 – Mohammad-Reza Mahdavi Kani, politician
 October 25 – Reyhaneh Jabbari, convicted and executed for the murder of her alleged rapist
 November 14 – Morteza Pashaei, pop singer, composer and musician
 November 16 – Babak Ghorbani, wrestler
 November 19 – Gholam Hossein Mazloumi, footballer 
 December 21 – Morteza Ahmadi, actor
 December 27 – Brigadier General Hamid Taqavi, the highest ranking Iranian military official to die in Iraq amid the Iranian military intervention in that country

See also
My Stealthy Freedom

References

 
Iran
Iran
2010s in Iran
Years of the 21st century in Iran